POU domain, class 4, transcription factor 1 (POU4F1) also known as brain-specific homeobox/POU domain protein 3A (BRN3A), homeobox/POU domain protein RDC-1 or Oct-T1 is a protein that in humans is encoded by the POU4F1 gene.

BRN3A (POU4F1) is a class IV POU domain-containing transcription factor highly expressed in the developing peripheral sensory nervous system (dorsal root ganglia, trigeminal ganglion, and hindbrain sensory ganglia), certain regions of the central nervous system, retinal neurons called ganglion cells, and in cells of the B- and T-lymphocytic lineages.

Discovery 
Brn3a was initially discovered in mice based on homology to the prototypal POU transcription factors Pit1 (Pituitary-specific positive transcription factor 1, Pou1f1), Oct1 (Pou2f1), and the Caenorhabditis elegans factor Unc86, and named Brn3. When multiple members of the Brn3 gene class were discovered, it was renamed Brn3.0 and Brn3a by different groups of researchers.  Subsequently, the gene was systematically renamed Pou4f1 in mice and POU4F1 in humans.  The protein product is still frequently referred to as Brn3a.

Function 
In addition to sensory neurons, in rodents and birds (and presumably humans) Brn3a is expressed in multiple sites in the central nervous system, including the spinal cord, midbrain superior colliculus, red nucleus, nucleus ambiguus, inferior olivary nucleus, habenula, and retina.

Mice with null mutations ("knockouts") in Brn3a die at birth, due to developmental defects in the nucleus ambiguus, which is essential for respiration.

Brn3a is a transcription factor which acts in development by regulating downstream "target" genes.  Microarrays have been used to determine many genes downstream of Brn3a in peripheral sensory neurons.

In the sensory neurons Brn3a is co-expressed with the LIM domain transcription factor ISL1 or Islet1, and has many downstream targets in common with Isl1. Pou4f1/Isl1 double mutant mice show strong epistatic effects in regulation of many downstream genes in the sensory neurons of double mutant mouse embryos.

Although the homozygous Brn3a null mutation is lethal at birth in mice, Brn3a null heterozygotes have no known phenotype. i.e. the Brn3a null mutation is completely recessive.  This can be explained by gene dosage compensation due to autoregulation, in which expression of the remaining copy of the Pou4f1 gene is increased in heterozygotes, leading to near-normal expression of its downstream targets. The combination of homozygote lethality and dosage compensation in heterozygotes may explain why POU4F1 mutations have not been identified in any human disease, whereas diseases are associated with several other members of the POU domain transcription factor class.

Interactions 

POU4F1 has been shown to interact with Estrogen receptor alpha, RIT2 and Ewing sarcoma breakpoint region 1.

See also 
 BRN-3

References

Further reading

External links 
 

POU-domain proteins